Aseman Gerd (also Romanized as Āsemān Gerd; also known as Āsemān Jerd and Asmāngird) is a village in Gel Berenji Rural District, Khafr District, Jahrom County, Fars Province, Iran. At the 2006 census, its population was 1,007, in 254 families.

References 

Populated places in  Jahrom County